Qiu Xiaoqi (born June 1956) is a retired Chinese diplomat who served as four times Ambassador: to Bolivia (1996–98), Andorra and Spain (2003–08), Brazil (2009–2011), and Mexico (2013–2019). He is a member of the 13th National Committee of the Chinese People's Political Consultative Conference.

Biography
Qiu was born in Luchuan County, Guangxi, in June 1956 and graduated from Beijing Foreign Studies University. 

Qiu joined the Chinese Communist Party (CCP) in 1974. He joined the foreign service in 1979 and has served primarily in South America. He was designated by President Hu Jintao in March 2009 to replace  as Chinese Ambassador to Brazil. In September 2013, he was made Chinese Ambassador to Mexico, and he held this post from 2013 until 2019.

Personal life 
He is married and has a son.

Honours and awards 
 2008  Order of Civil Merit
 2011  Order of the Southern Cross
 2019  Order of the Aztec Eagle

References

1956 births
Living people
People from Luchuan County
Beijing Foreign Studies University alumni
Ambassadors of China to Bolivia
Ambassadors of China to Mexico
Ambassadors of China to Brazil
Ambassadors of China to Spain
Ambassadors of China to Andorra
Diplomats of the People's Republic of China
People's Republic of China politicians from Guangxi
Chinese Communist Party politicians from Guangxi
Members of the 13th Chinese People's Political Consultative Conference